Studzienice may refer to the following places in Poland:
Studzienice, Masovian Voivodeship (east-central Poland)
Studzienice, Bytów County in Pomeranian Voivodeship (north Poland)
Studzienice, Starogard County in Pomeranian Voivodeship (north Poland)
Studzienice, Silesian Voivodeship (south Poland)